Kamilla Bartone (born 7 June 2002) is a Latvian tennis player.

Bartone has a career-high ITF junior combined ranking of 6, achieved on 21 October 2019.

She won the 2019 US Open on girls' doubles with Oksana Selekhmeteva.

Bartone made her WTA Tour main-draw debut at the 2019 Baltic Open in the doubles draw, partnering Ksenia Aleshina.

Junior career

Junior Grand Slam performance
Singles:

 Australian Open: QF (2019)

 French Open: 3R (2019)

 Wimbledon: 1R (2019)

 US Open: QF (2019)

Doubles:

 Australian Open: SF (2020)

 French Open: SF (2020)

 Wimbledon: F (2019)

 US Open: W (2019)

ITF Circuit finals

Singles: 1 (title)

Doubles: 4 (2 titles, 2 runner–ups)

Junior Grand Slam finals

Girls' doubles: 2 (1 title, 1 runner–up)

ITF Junior Circuit finals

Singles: 7 (4 titles, 3 runner–ups)

Doubles: 10 (6 titles, 4 runner–ups)

Notes

References

External links
 
 

2002 births
Living people
Latvian female tennis players
Sportspeople from Riga
Grand Slam (tennis) champions in girls' doubles
US Open (tennis) junior champions